Flavio Behring (born) is a Grand Master, 9th-degree red belt in Brazilian jiu-jitsu. A student under Hélio Gracie he began his career in 1947 and is one of the longest practitioner and coach of Brazilian jiu-jitsu.

Career 
Flavio Behring was born on 21 November 1937, he started learning Brazilian jiu-jitsu (BJJ) at the age of 10 at Helio Gracie’s academy in Rio de Janeiro, at 14 he was moved to the Gracie Academy in Rio Branco where he became an instructor in 1955, while continuing to study under both Helio Gracie and João Alberto Barreto. In the early 60's Behring started to also training Judo and competing in championships. In 1970, together with Ricardo Murgel, Behring opened his first gym in Barra da Tijuca , Rio de Janeiro.

In 1987 with the help of his son Marcelo, a black belt under Rickson Gracie and "one of BJJ’s shining stars", Behring opened his own school. On 5 September 2006 Behring received his red belt from his former coach Joao Alberto Barreto, earning with it the title of Grand Master, the 9th-degree red belt is the highest rank achievable to any  living practitioner of Brazilian jiu-jitsu.

Instructor lineage 
Mitsuyo Maeda > Carlos Gracie > Helio Gracie > Flavio Behring

Notes

References 

Living people
1937 births
Brazilian practitioners of Brazilian jiu-jitsu
People awarded a red belt in Brazilian jiu-jitsu